, stylized as élf, was a Japanese eroge studio. One of its most popular games is Dōkyūsei, a pioneering dating sim, which has had a sequel and been turned into adult OVA series.  The character design of the main villains from the -saku series is the company mascot. They are also known for role-playing video games such as the Dragon Knight series and visual novel adventure games such as YU-NO.   Many ELF games had been turned into adult OVA series.  Three of ELF game series had even been turned into TV anime series: Elf-ban Kakyūsei, Raimuiro Senkitan and YU-NO.

Elf was founded on April 27, 1989 in Tokyo. EFC, the ELF Fan Club (エルフＦＣ), has an active membership. There is a project that aims at recreating the game engine for other platforms. After 27 years, it was announced in October 2015 that the company was closing for business. Some of their games were re-released by DMM Games.

Video games

Yellow Vip (Windows)

Silky's

Silky's is a game studio whose games are mostly distributed by ELF, and several of which have been made into OAV.

 Ai Shimai 愛姉妹～二人の果実～ (also called Immoral Sisters : Two Immature Fruits)
 Ai Shimai Tsubomi 愛姉妹・蕾　...汚してください (also called Immoral Sisters - Bloom ...Please Deflower and Aishimai 2)
 Ai Shimai Docchi ni Suru no!! 愛姉妹 どっちにするの!!
 BE-YOND ビ・ヨンド　黒大将に見られてる
 Birthdays バース・デイズ
 Valentine Kiss Birthdays 2 バレンタイン・キッス 〜バースデイズ2〜
 Dorei Kaigo 奴隷介護
 Flutter of Birds flutter of birds ～鳥達の羽ばたき～ (also called Virgin Touch)
Flutter of Birds 2 flutter of birds II 天使たちの翼 (also called Flutter of Birds 2: Wings of an Angel)
 Itoshi no Kotodama 愛しの言霊
 Jokei Kazoku 女系家族
 Mobius Roid Möbius Roid メビウスロイド (also called Moebius Roid)
 Nikutai Ten'i 肉体転移 (also called Teni)
 Shitai o Arau 肢体を洗う (also called Slave Nurse)
 Sweet Hanjuku na Tenshi-tachi sweet ～半熟な天使たち～ (also called Sweet: Semi-Matured Angel)

See also
 Bishōjo game
 C's Ware
 List of Japanese erotic video games
 List of hentai authors
 Ryu Umemoto

References 

 Information is provided by ELF via the eNN, ELF News Network (eNNニュース).

External links
  
 Silky's official website 

Hentai companies
Video game companies established in 1989
Video game companies disestablished in 2015
Video game publishing brands
Mass media in Tokyo
Defunct video game companies of Japan